Darajat Georhermal Power Plant Complex is a geothermal power plant situated in District Pasirwangi, Garut, West Java, roughly  south-east of Jakarta. The complex is in the Mt Kendang area, where 2000 meters above ocean level on the volcanic mountains. The Darajat geothermal field is a generous excellent asset delivering dry steam at the wellhead. The asset is one of just a couple of dry steam fields on the planet.

Darajat I
In December 1984 Amoseas sign in contract with Pertamina and PLN, they build up geothermal power stations 330 MW capacity, inside a 56,650 hectare region in Darajat, West Java. Amoseas provides the steam, PLN started operating first power plant with 55-MW in November 1994.

Darajat II
Construction of unit II in 1997, but the government suspended plant construction in 1998 because Indonesian monetary crisis. In April 2000, Chevron Geothermal Indonesia continued the project, they installed capacity for this unit is 94 MW.

Darajat III
Operated in 2007, by Chevron Geothermal, Darajat is capable of producing 110 MW. In 2009 the generator capacity was increased to 121 MW.

References

Geothermal power stations in Indonesia